Bryce Coleman Stringam (February 8, 1920 – June 2, 2000) was a politician and author from Alberta, Canada. He served in the Legislative Assembly of Alberta from 1955 to 1959 as an independent.

Early life
Stringam's father, George Stringam, was a member of the Alberta legislature. Stringam graduated from Olds College with a degree in agronomy in 1937 and became a cattle rancher. He married Mary Morgan and fathered seven children.

Political career
Stringam first ran for a seat in the Alberta Legislature in the 1955 general election. Running as an independent in the electoral district of Bow Valley-Empress, he defeated incumbent Wilson Cain.

Stringam ran for a second term in office in the 1959 general election and was defeated by Social Credit candidate William Delday in a two-way race.

Late life
After his defeat, Stringam published a book titled ''The History of the Eastern Irrigation District: 25th Anniversary in 1960.

References

External links
Legislative Assembly of Alberta Members Listing

1920 births
2000 deaths
Independent Alberta MLAs
People from Cardston